Prepops fraternus is a species of plant bug in the family Miridae. It is found in North America. It is normally found on sumac.

Subspecies
These four subspecies belong to the species Prepops fraternus:
 Prepops fraternus discifer (Knight, 1923)
 Prepops fraternus fraternus (Knight, 1923)
 Prepops fraternus regalis (Knight, 1923)
 Prepops fraternus rubromarginatus (Knight, 1923)

References

Further reading

 

Articles created by Qbugbot
Insects described in 1923
Restheniini